Scott Blumstein (born March 27, 1992) is an American poker player from Morristown, New Jersey. In 2017, he won the World Series of Poker Main Event for $8,150,000.

Blumstein graduated from Temple University with an accounting degree before becoming a professional poker player. Prior to the Main Event, his largest career cash came in a preliminary event at the Borgata Summer Poker Open in July 2016, where he earned $199,854. He also has three cashes on the WSOP Circuit. Online, he has nearly $150,000 in total career winnings.

At the 2017 Main Event, Blumstein prevailed over a field of 7,221 players, the third-largest in history at the time. He entered the final table as chip leader and defeated Dan Ott on the 246th hand and 65th of heads-up play when his  overcame Ott's  with a deuce on the river.

As of 2019, Blumstein's career tournament winnings exceed $8,500,000.

World Series of Poker bracelets

References

1992 births
Living people
American poker players
World Series of Poker Main Event winners
World Series of Poker bracelet winners
Temple University alumni
Morristown High School (Morristown, New Jersey) alumni
People from Morristown, New Jersey
20th-century American Jews
21st-century American Jews